From the Moon to the Sun is the fourth solo studio album by American rock artist Kip Winger. The album was released in 2008.

Track listing
 "Every Story Told" - 4:28
 "Nothing" - 3:21
 "Where Will You Go" - 3:55
 "Pages and Pages" - 6:45  
 "Ghosts" - 5:43
 "In Your Eyes Another Life" - 3:52
 "Runaway" - 5:24
 "California" - 3:59
 "What We Are"  - 3:30
 "One Big Game"  - 3:46
 "Why" - 6:42
 "Reason to Believe" - 4:32

Bonus tracks
 "Monster" [Remix] (European bonus track)
 "Holy Man (A Prayer for Darrell Lance Abbott)" (Japanese bonus track)

Album credits
 Produced, engineered, arranged and mixed by Kip Winger

See also
Winger

References

External links
 The official Kip Winger website
 

2008 albums
Albums produced by Kip Winger
Frontiers Records albums